Bodden Town Football Club is a Cayman Island football club, which currently plays in the Cayman Islands'  Premier League.

Achievements
Cayman Islands League: 4
 2012–13, 2013–14, 2016–17, 2019–20

Cayman Islands FA Cup: 4
 2000–01, 2008–09, 2012–13, 2016–17

Current roster

Former players

  Wesley Robinson

References

 soccerway.tv
 caribbeanfootballdatabase.com

Football clubs in the Cayman Islands
Association football clubs established in 1970
1970 establishments in the Cayman Islands